Sara Japhet (sometimes Sarah Yefet, ; born November 18, 1934) is an Israeli biblical scholar. She is the Yehezkel Kaufmann Professor Emerita of Bible Studies at the Hebrew University of Jerusalem. She is considered a leading authority on the books of Chronicles by Oxford University Press.

Biography 
Japhet was born in Petah Tikva to parents who had immigrated to Israel in the 1920s. She studied at the Hebrew Teachers College David Yellin in Jerusalem and became one of the first students involved in the academic teacher training program conducted with the Hebrew University. Later, she taught immigrants to Israel at night school. She earned her PhD from Hebrew University in 1973. She has held the positions of head of the Department of Bible and head of the Institute of Jewish Studies at the Hebrew University and has also been the director of the National and University Library between 1997 and 2001.

Japhet won the Israel Prize in 2004 for her contribution to Biblical studies focusing on the Second Temple period. Japhet has held the position of president of the World Union of Jewish Studies since 2006.

In 2007, a Festschrift was published in her honor. Shai le-Sara Japhet: Studies in the Bible, Its Exegesis and Language Presented to Sara Japhet included contributions from Adele Berlin, Tamara Eskenazi, Gary Knoppers, David J. A. Clines, J. Cheryl Exum, Jacob Milgrom, Yairah Amit, and Emanuel Tov.

Her son Gilad Japhet is an entrepreneur and an Israeli genealogist, CEO and founder of MyHeritage.

Works
 

n.b. other titles have been written in Hebrew.

References

External links 
 Interview
 Interview at Oxford
 Emory University lecture

1934 births
Living people
Israeli biblical scholars
Old Testament scholars
Israel Prize in biblical studies recipients
Academic staff of the Hebrew University of Jerusalem
Hebrew University of Jerusalem alumni
People from Petah Tikva
Female biblical scholars
Israeli women academics